General elections were held in Chile on 30 October 1932. Arturo Alessandri of the Liberal Party was elected president, whilst the Conservative Party and Radical Party emerged as the largest parties in the Chamber of Deputies.

Background
The election took place roughly a year after the previous election, but political and economic instability caused by the Great Depression which hit a low in mid-1932, only made the situation worse. President Montero had to resign shortly after a mutiny led by Marmaduque Grove, who headed the Socialist Republic of Chile until being overthrown by former ally Carlos Dávila who would also be overthrown, this time by Bartolome Blanche. After his downfall, Abraham Oyanedel became head of state. The return of Alessandri became so highly awaited that he won the election in a landslide ending a turbulent and bitter year for the country, being considered today as the worst one in Chilean history.

Electoral system
The presidential election was held using the absolute majority system, under which a candidate had to receive over 50% of the popular vote to be elected. If no candidate received over 50% of the vote, both houses of the National Congress would come together to vote on the two candidates that received the most votes.

Results

President

Senate

Chamber of Deputies

Aftermath
Following the elections, three of the independent candidates elected to the Chamber of Deputies joined the Communist Party.

References

Presidential elections in Chile
1932 in Chile
Chile
Elections in Chile
October 1932 events
Election and referendum articles with incomplete results